Clystea leucaspis is a moth of the subfamily Arctiinae. It was described by Pieter Cramer in 1775. It is found in Venezuela, Bolivia and Brazil.

References

Clystea
Moths described in 1775
Taxa named by Pieter Cramer